SKA Khabarovsk may refer to:
FC SKA-Khabarovsk, a Russian football club
Amur Khabarovsk, founded as SKA Khabarovsk, a Russian ice hockey team